Anne Pasternak (born 1964) is a curator and museum director. She is the current Shelby White and Leon Levy Director of the Brooklyn Museum.

Education 
Pasternak was born in Baltimore and received her undergraduate degree in Art History and Business Management from the University of Massachusetts, Amherst. She went on to take graduate courses at Hunter College but left without taking a degree.

Pasternak has been awarded honorary doctorates from Pratt Institute and Hunter College

Career 
Pasternak's career began with an internship turned directorship at the Stux Gallery in Boston in the 1980s. She then served as Curator at Real Art Ways, an arts nonprofit in Hartford, Connecticut. She curated public art projects with such now acclaimed artists as Mel Chin and Mark Dion as well as the groundbreaking exhibition "Hip Hop Nation".

Creative Time 
In 1993 Anne Pasternak left Real Art Ways and became the Executive Director of Creative Time. There she curated and organized numerous exhibitions, events, discussions, and public art projects including the annual "Tribute In Light"  memorial honoring the lives lost on September 11, 2001; Paul Chan's Waiting for Godot in Post-Katrina New Orleans, and Kara Walker's A Subtlety in Brooklyn's Domino Sugar Factory in the Williamsburg neighborhood.

Brooklyn Museum 
In 2015, Pasternak left Creative Time and replaced Arnold L. Lehman as the director of the Brooklyn Museum. Pasternak's directorship at the Brooklyn Museum marks the first time a woman has kept a directing role in an encyclopedic New York museum.  As a former director of a public art organization, this new position represents a shift in her career from a broader public sphere into the architecture of a museum.

Her portrait is included in the series of Female Museum Art Director by artist Amy Chaiklin.

Awards and recognition
Ufficiale dell’Ordine della Stella d’Italia, 2018
Crains 50 Most Powerful Women in New York, 2019

References

Living people
Brooklyn Museum
American art curators
American women curators
1964 births
University of Massachusetts Amherst alumni
21st-century American women